Anthony Whorton-Eales (born 21 May 1994 in Lichfield) is a British racing driver who currently competes in the MINI Challenge JCW Championship driving the No. 10 for Jamsport Racing. He previously won the Mini Challenge UK championship in 2018 and the Renault Clio Cup UK championship in 2016.

Racing career

Early career

Whorton-Eales began his car racing career at the age of 11 on the short ovals in the ORCi Ministox under the number 254 with Incarace Motor Sport  in which he raced until his 16th birthday. In 2011 he joined the Renault UK Clio Cup, running four races for Scuderia Vittoria. In 2012 he ran his first full season in the series for Westbourne Motorsport, finishing the season 8th in points. For 2013 he joined the KX Akademy as well as becoming a member of the BRDC's rising stars. This saw him return to Scuderia Vittoria where he would take his first Clio Cup win on his way to 7th in points. The following two seasons saw him move to SV Racing coming 4th in points in 2014 while 2015 saw him become a championship contender against Ashley Sutton and Ash Hand, he eventually finished the season bottom of the trio, 3rd in points.

2016 saw Whorton-Eales run for his own team where he would battle returning 2014 champion, Mike Bushell for the championship. In the end he narrowly came out on top to win the Renault UK Clio Cup title on his fifth attempt.

Whorton-Eales is still competitive on the short ovals, racing in everything from a budget formula known as Incarods to Classic Hot Rods, and he has also competed in BriSCA Formula One Stock Cars where he is the current Under-25 Champion.

British Touring Car Championship

For the 2017 season, Whorton-Eales was signed by AmD Tuning to compete in the British Touring Car Championship. He drove the team's second Audi S3 alongside Ollie Jackson.

Whorton-Eales missed the first half of the 2018 BTCC season, replacing Tom Boardman at AmD during the mid-season break. He returned to the Championship at Snetterton for the BTCC 60th Anniversary meeting.

Mini Challenge UK

Unable to find a drive for the 2018 BTCC season, Whorton-Eales moved to the Mini Challenge UK with JamSport Racing where he would secure the drivers championship that season. After leaving the series to compete in the NASCAR Whelen Euro Series, it was announced on 6 November 2019 that Whorton-Eales will be returning to the series in 2020 to compete full-time with JamSport Racing.

NASCAR Whelen Euro Series

2019 saw Whorton-Eales move to the NASCAR Whelen Euro Series with AmD Tuning in a partnership with Racing-Total and Jennifer Jo Cobb Racing. He would drive the No. 46 Ford Mustang full-time in the Elite 1 class.

Racing record

Complete British Touring Car Championship results
(key) (Races in bold indicate pole position – 1 point awarded just in first race; races in italics indicate fastest lap – 1 point awarded all races; * signifies that driver led race for at least one lap – 1 point given all races)

Complete NASCAR results

NASCAR Whelen Euro Series – Elite 1

References

External links
Career summary on Driver Database

Living people
1994 births
British racing drivers
British Touring Car Championship drivers
Sportspeople from Lichfield
NASCAR drivers
Renault UK Clio Cup drivers
Mini Challenge UK drivers